Adenophora is a genus of flowering plants in the family Campanulaceae, the bellflowers. Plants of this genus are known commonly as ladybells. Most are native to eastern Asia, with a few in Europe. Many are endemic to either China or Siberia.

Description
These plants are perennial herbs, often with thick, fleshy roots. The stem usually grows erect from a caudex. There are usually several basal leaves borne on long petioles. The leaves on the stem are alternately arranged in most species. Flowers are solitary or borne in cymes. The corolla of the flower is bell-shaped, funnel-shaped, or tubular, with five lobes. The corollas of most species are blue. There is a characteristic nectar disc at the base of the stamens.

Diversity
There are about 62 species in the genus.

Species include:

 Adenophora amurica – Heilongjiang
 Adenophora brevidiscifera – Sichuan
 Adenophora capillaris – Chongqing, Guizhou, Hebei, Henan, Hubei, Inner Mongolia, Shaanxi, Shandong, Shanxi, Sichuan, Yunnan
 Adenophora changaica – Mongolia
 Adenophora coelestis – Sichuan, Yunnan
 Adenophora contracta – Liaoning, Inner Mongolia
 Adenophora cordifolia – Henan
 Adenophora divaricata – spreading-branch ladybell – Honshu, Shikoku, Korea, Amur, Primorye, Khabarovsk, Hebei, Heilongjiang, Jilin, Liaoning, Shandong, Shanxi 
 Adenophora elata – Hebei, Inner Mongolia, Shanxi 
 Adenophora erecta – erect ladybell – Ulleungdo Island
 Adenophora fusifolia – South Korea
 Adenophora gmelinii – narrow-leaf ladybell – Buryatiya, Chita, Amur, Primorye, Mongolia, Korea, Hebei, Heilongjiang, Jilin, Liaoning, Inner Mongolia, Shanxi 
Adenophora golubinzevaeana – Krasnoyarsk
Adenophora grandiflora – big-flower ladybell – Korea
Adenophora hatsushimae – Kyushu
 Adenophora himalayana – Kazakhstan, Kyrgyzstan, Tajikistan, Tibet, Nepal, northern India, Xinjiang, Gansu, Shaanxi, Sichuan 
 Adenophora hubeiensis – Hubei
Adenophora × izuensis – Honshu
Adenophora jacutica – Yakutiya
 Adenophora jasionifolia – Tibet, Sichuan, Yunnan 
Adenophora kayasanensis – Gayasan ladybell – Korea
 Adenophora khasiana (syn. A. bulleyana) – Assam, Bhutan, Myanmar, Tibet, Sichuan, Yunnan
Adenophora koreana – Korean ladybell – Korea
 Adenophora lamarckii – Lamark's ladybell – Irkutsk, Altai, Kazakhstan, Xinjiang, Mongolia, Korea 
 Adenophora liliifolia – lily-leaf ladybell central and eastern Europe (Germany, Switzerland, Italy, etc.) east to Xinjiang
 Adenophora liliifolioides – Gansu, Shaanxi, Sichuan, Tibet
 Adenophora lobophylla – Sichuan
 Adenophora longipedicellata – Chongqing, Guizhou, W Hubei, Sichuan
Adenophora maximowicziana – Shikoku
 Adenophora micrantha – Inner Mongolia 
 Adenophora morrisonensis – Taiwan
 Adenophora nikoensis – Honshu
 Adenophora ningxianica – Gansu, Inner Mongolia, Ningxia 
 Adenophora palustris – marsh ladybell – Jilin, Korea, Honshu
 Adenophora pereskiifolia – Manchurian ladybell – Mongolia, Japan, Korea, Heilongjiang, Jilin, Amur, Kuril Islands, Primorye, Khabarovsk, Chita, Buryatiya
 Adenophora petiolata – Anhui, Chongqing, Fujian, Gansu, Guangdong, Guangxi, Guizhou, Hebei, Henan, Hubei, Hunan, Jiangsu, Jiangxi, Shaanxi, Shanxi, Sichuan, Zhejiang
 Adenophora pinifolia – Liaoning
 Adenophora polyantha – many-flower ladybell – Korea, Anhui, Gansu, Hebei, Henan, Jiangsu, Liaoning, Inner Mongolia, Ningxia, Shaanxi, Shandong, Shanxi 
 Adenophora potaninii – Gansu, Hebei, Henan, Liaoning, Inner Mongolia, Ningxia, Qinghai, Shaanxi, Shanxi, Sichuan
Adenophora probatovae – Primorye
Adenophora racemosa – racemose ladybell – Korea
Adenophora remotidens – Incheon ladybell – Korea
 Adenophora remotiflora – scattered ladybell – Primorye, Japan, Korea, Manchuria
Adenophora rupestris – Irkutsk
 Adenophora rupincola – Hubei, Hunan, Jiangxi, Sichuan
Adenophora sajanensis – Krasnoyarsk 
 Adenophora sinensis – Anhui, Fujian, Guangdong, Hunan, Jiangxi
Adenophora stenanthina – Mongolia, Gansu, Hebei, Jilin, Inner Mongolia, Ningxia, Qinghai, Shaanxi, Shanxi, Altai, Amur, Irkutsk, Chita, Buryatiya, Tuva 
 Adenophora stenophylla – Mongolia, Inner Mongolia, Manchuria
 Adenophora stricta – upright ladybell – Korea, Japan, Anhui, Chongqing, Fujian, Gansu, Guangxi, Guizhou, Henan, Hubei, Hunan, Jiangsu, Jiangxi, Shaanxi, Sichuan, Yunnan, Zhejiang
Adenophora sublata – Primorye, Khabarovsk
Adenophora takedae – Honshu
Adenophora taquetii – Jejudo ladybell – Korea
Adenophora tashiroi – Fukue Island, Jeju-do Island
Adenophora taurica – Crimea
Adenophora trachelioides – Anhui, Hebei, Jiangsu, Liaoning, Inner Mongolia, Shandong, Zhejiang
Adenophora tricuspidata – Heilongjiang, Inner Mongolia, much of Asiatic Russia
 Adenophora triphylla – giant bellflower – Korea, Japan, Ryukyu Islands, Taiwan, Laos, Vietnam, Russian Far East, Siberia
Adenophora uryuensis – Hokkaido
Adenophora wilsonii – Chongqing, Gansu, Guizhou, Hubei, Shaanxi, Sichuan
Adenophora wulingshanica – Beijing 
Adenophora xifengensis – Gansu

Uses
Many Adenophora species have been used in traditional Chinese medicine.

References

Campanuloideae
Campanulaceae genera